

Beornheah was a Bishop of Selsey.

Beornheah is said to have been consecrated by Archbishop Plegmund on the same day as six other bishops, about 909.  In 930 Beornheah received a grant from King Athelstan.

Beornheah died between 930 and 931.

Citations

References

Further reading

External links
 

Bishops of Selsey
10th-century English bishops